Owen Township is one of twelve townships in Clark County, Indiana. As of the 2010 census, its population was 958 and it contained 462 housing units.

History
Owen Township was established around 1830. It was named for John Owen, a county commissioner.

Geography

Unincorporated towns
 Hibernia
 Owen
 Sunset Village
 Vesta
(This list is based on USGS data and may include former settlements.)

Adjacent townships
 Washington Township (north)
 Bethlehem Township (northeast)
 Charlestown Township (west)
 Oregon Township (northwest)

Major highways
  Indiana State Road 62

Cemeteries
The township contains several cemeteries: Bowyer ( Hogan), Conn, Hibernia, Hogan, Manaugh, Olive Branch, Owen Creek Presbyterian/Baptist Church, Perry, Pleasant View, Shiloh (a.k.a. Owen Township)

References
 United States Census Bureau cartographic boundary files
 U.S. Board on Geographic Names

External links
 Indiana Township Association
 United Township Association of Indiana

Townships in Clark County, Indiana
Townships in Indiana
Populated places established in 1830
1830 establishments in Indiana